Tamara Taylor (born 8 October 1981) is an English female rugby union player, who captained England in the 2015 Women's Six Nations Championship. She was the 2017 RPA Player of the Year when she was one of only three women who had made more than 100 appearances for her country. She is currently the 2nd most capped England player of all time.

Career
She was educated at The Oratory Preparatory School, Queen Anne's School, Caversham and Newcastle University where she read Biomedical Sciences. Taylor represented  at the 2014,  2010, 2006 and 2017 World Cups, winning in 2014. Taylor joined the Jarrovians RUFC as a coach in October 2013. and currently is player coach at Darlington Mowden Park Sharks.

She was the 2017 RPA Player of the Year when she was one of only three women who had made more than 100 appearances for her country. She was again the Lock in the team for the 2017 Women's Rugby World Cup.

References

External links
Player Profile

1981 births
Living people
England women's international rugby union players
English female rugby union players
People educated at Queen Anne's School
Rugby union players from Exeter